The UConn Huskies women's ice hockey program represented the University of Connecticut Huskies during the 2015–16 NCAA Division I women's ice hockey season.

Offseason

April 23: Elaine Chuli was chosen to participate in the Team Canada Development Team Strength and Conditioning camp.

Recruiting

Roster

2015–16 Huskies

Schedule

|-
!colspan=12 align="center"  style=""| Regular Season

|-
!colspan=12 align="center"  style=""| WHEA Tournament

Awards and honors
Goaltender Elaine Chuli named to All American Second Team All Stars.  She became the all-time leading saves leader in WHEA History. She was also named to the WHEA First All-Star Team, as the leagues leading Goaltender.
Defender Alyson Matteau was named to the WHEA's Rookie All-Star Team.
Forward Leah Burress was named WHEA's Best Defensive Forward.

Sources

References

Connecticut
UConn Huskies women's ice hockey seasons
Conn
Connect
Connect